The Ireland women's national under-16 basketball team is a national basketball team of the Island of Ireland, administered by Basketball Ireland.
It represents the country in international under-16 women's basketball competitions. The team appeared at the FIBA U16 Women's European Championship Division B several times.

References

External links
Archived records of Ireland team participations

under16
Women's national under-16 basketball teams